Hudiyan or Hudian may refer to:
 Hudian, Sistan and Baluchestan
 Hudian Rural District, in Sistan and Baluchestan Province